Timothy Maxwell "Max" Keiser (born January 23, 1960) is an American broadcaster and film maker. He hosted Keiser Report, a financial program broadcast on RT that featured heterodox economics theories. Until November 2012, Keiser anchored On the Edge, a program of news and analysis hosted by Iran's Press TV. He hosted the New Year's Eve special The Keiser's Business Guide to 2010 for BBC Radio 5 Live.
Keiser presented a season of The Oracle with Max Keiser on BBC World News. He produced and appeared in the TV series People & Power on the Al-Jazeera English network.

Alongside his wife Stacy Herbert, he co-hosted the weekly economics programme Double Down on Radio Sputnik, presented a weekly show about finance and markets on London's Resonance FM, and wrote for The Huffington Post. He lived in London from about 2011, but returned to the US in 2017.

As of June 2022 it is unclear as to which traditional media Keiser still contributes, if any, following his earlier departure from RT / Keiser Report in the Spring of 2022 and other, prior, high-profile media contributions. He remains quite active on Twitter and other social media platforms.

Early career
Keiser grew up in Westchester County, New York. After studying theatre at New York University, he took a variety of jobs in stand-up comedy and in radio, a part-time job as a stockbroker in the 1980s at Paine Webber, and at the midtown office of Oppenheimer and Co. Inc. under David Tufts.

Hollywood Stock Exchange

Keiser is the creator, co-founder, and former CEO of HSX Holdings/Hollywood Stock Exchange, later sold to Cantor Fitzgerald. Alongside Michael R. Burns, he co-invented the Virtual Specialist  platform on which the Hollywood Stock Exchange operates. This technology allows traders to exchange virtual securities, such as "MovieStocks" and "StarBonds", with convertible virtual currency, the "Hollywood Dollar". In 1998 Digital Coast Reporter recognized Keiser as one of Los Angeles' top 50 internet executives for his work on this project.

Broadcasting career
Keiser presented Rumble at the Box Office for NBC's Access Hollywood. He also produced and hosted the weekly talk show Buy, Sell, Hold for CBS radio's KLSX in Los Angeles, CA. He also presented The Truth About Markets on Resonance 104.4 FM in London, but the show is no longer listed on their website as of at least June 2022.

People & Power

Keiser produced 10 short documentary films covering aspects of financial markets for Al Jazeera's series People & Power. The films include Rigged Markets, Money Geyser, Death of the Dollar, Peaked, Extraordinary Antics, Savers vs Speculators, Banking On It, Private Finance or Public Swindle? and Focus on Locusts.

The Oracle with Max Keiser
A pilot episode was produced for Al-Jazeera English titled The Oracle. The show was developed into a series for BBC World News. The series first aired on January 9, 2009. Keiser left the BBC after ten episodes. On Twitter, he said he left because he was ordered not to mention Israel in any context.

On the Edge
A weekly half-hour financial commentary show that started in 2009 and broadcast on Press TV.

The Keiser Report

From September 2009 until February 2022, Keiser hosted The Keiser Report with financial news and analysis, on the RT network. The 30-minute program is produced three times a week. Stacy Herbert (Keiser's wife) was the co-host; she bantered with Keiser on headlines and commentary. Most episodes are divided into two parts. In the first half, Keiser and Herbert alternately discussed a current financial topic, commented on financial media reports, and provided commentary on the actions of bankers. The second half featured a guest interview, either face-to-face in the studio or through video conferencing, conducted by Keiser.

An episode broadcast in September 2011 featured an interview with comedian Roseanne Barr, who satirically stated that her solution to the financial crisis was to "bring back the guillotine".

The show's guests regularly included advocates for and entrepreneurs working in the cryptocurrency and blockchain fields.

The show ended in February 2022 after Keiser and Herbert resigned from RT and deleted previous pro-Russian statements in response to the 2022 Russian invasion of Ukraine.

Financial punditry
Keiser has appeared as a financial pundit on a number of news networks. Keiser called for a "fatwā" against Hank Paulson on Al Jazeera in response to the Troubled Asset Relief Program (TARP). In a later broadcast Keiser said, "Paulson stinks". Keiser has advised investors to buy bitcoin and precious metals such as gold and silver, in order to undermine "the banksters". In November 2012, he predicted that the UK pound was about to collapse.

Activism

Karmabanque
Keiser founded the hedge fund Karmabanque, which sought to profit from any decline in equity value of companies that are susceptible to boycott from environmental groups. The hedge fund's progress was followed monthly in The Ecologist magazine. Its targets included Coca-Cola and McDonald's.

The Karmabanque hedge fund project was designed to simultaneously short-sell companies while funneling profits into environmental and ethical-business pressure groups that further act to drive down the companies' stock prices. Describing the project, Keiser stated, "The Internet allows people, activists, from all over the world to gather, or swarm, and hit a company where it hurts most—in their stock price."

The Guardian newspaper described Keiser's Karmabanque hedge fund as a "fantastical scheme" and accused him of trying to exist "beyond the normal forces and controls of society". A spokesman for Ryanair said, "Since they put Ryanair on their list, our share price has gone up by 10 percent. We are always delighted to be part of a list which includes Coca-Cola, Starbucks, and Wal-Mart."

Extraordinary Antics
In the Al-Jazeera short film Extraordinary Antics, Keiser traveled to Milan and Venice to find out how Central Intelligence Agency station chief Robert Seldon Lady and his fellow CIA agents spent $500,000 on a procedure known as extraordinary rendition, an illegal practice that resulted in an Egyptian citizen, who had been granted asylum in Italy, being abducted and tortured in Cairo.

The CIA was prosecuted for the case and Robert Seldon Lady was found guilty in a Milan court. He was sentenced on November 9, 2009 to nine years in prison, according to The Guardian. This verdict was upheld on appeal, but the US refuses to extradite Lady to Italy.

Crash JP Morgan—buy silver
Keiser has labeled JPMorgan Chase "the biggest financial terrorist on Wall Street" in relation to their alleged manipulation of the price of silver. Keiser created a campaign called "Crash JP Morgan—buy silver", whereby people buy silver bullion, thus raising its price and leaving JP Morgan with a huge short position to cover, the margin of which are collateralized by JPMorgan's own stock price, bankrupting itself. The campaign was introduced on the Alex Jones Radio show in November 2010. Writing in The Guardian in December 2010, Keiser suggested that the text "crash jp morgan buy silver" should be used as a googlebomb to virally promote the campaign.

Adweek magazine described Keiser as "the most visible character in an underground movement that has spurred hundreds of blog posts and videos, and played some small part in driving up the price of precious metals".

Keiser drew criticism at the 2000 ShowBiz Expo in Las Vegas when he said of media content that "Everything is inescapably going to a price point called free." In response, Kevin Tsujihara, executive vice president of New Media at Warner Bros., commented that "Piracy.com" will be the victor if superior content is available on sites supported by advertisements.

In 2005, Steven Milloy, the "Junk Science" commentator, demanded that Keiser be removed from the panel of the Triple Bottom Line Investing conference, where he was scheduled to appear. Milloy accused Keiser of making threats against his organization and petitioned sponsors Calvert Investments and KLD Research & Analytics to withdraw from the project. Robert Rubenstein, founder of conference organiser Brooklyn Bridge, stated that Keiser's comments "do not constitute a threat to person or property and are not related to the conference or the content that will be presented there".

The Atlantic magazine's The Wire website speculated that a Downfall parody video created to promote Keiser's campaign was implicated in the sacking of Grant Williams, the Asia equity trading head at J.P. Morgan.

Personal life
Keiser is married to Stacy Herbert, a former Canadian television presenter of the Keiser Report on RT, and Double Down on Radio Sputnik.

See also

Error account – a term often mentioned by Max Keiser

References

External links

 
 

1960 births
Living people
American chief executives of financial services companies
American documentary film producers
American male journalists
American expatriates in the United Kingdom
Television personalities from New Rochelle, New York
Tisch School of the Arts alumni
American stockbrokers
RT (TV network) people